Spirobolellus praslinus is an extinct species of millipede in the family Spirobolidae. The species was endemic to Praslin Island of Seychelles.

References

Animals described in 1902